New Interface (a design with friends for the future) is the third studio album by the Wandas, independently released in conjunction with the band's publishing company, TFMRA, LLC in 2013.

Track listing
 "New Interface" –  3:55  McEachern / Battey / Lucivero 
 "Davy Jones' Locher" – 3:07  Battey 
 "Mad Man" – 3:01  McEachern
 "Good Feeling" – 3:49  Battey
 "Killer Heart" - 4:14  McEachern
 "Velvet Dream" – 2:38  McEachern
 "American Land" – 3:18  Battey
 "How I'm Doing" – 3:44  McEachern
 "Hood River Blues" – 2:56  McEachern / Battey / Lucivero 
 "My Mourning" – 2:56  Battey

Personnel
The Wandas
Keith McEachern – Lead vocals, guitar, synth, keyboards, glockenspiel, percussion
Brent Battey – Lead vocals, guitar, keyboards
Ross Lucivero – Bass guitar, gang vocal
Greg Settino – Drums, percussion, gang vocal
Joel Ford – Producer, synthesizer, harmonies

Technical
Patrick Krief – Mixer
J. Saliba – Engineer
Ryan Morey – Mastering

References

2013 albums
The Wandas albums